{{Infobox Boxingmatch
| fight date = October 18, 2008
| Fight Name = Unstoppable
| image = 
| location = Boardwalk Hall Atlantic City, New Jersey, U.S.
| fighter1 = Kelly Pavlik
| nickname1 = The Ghost
| record1 = 34-0 (30 KO)
| height1 = 6 ft 2 in
| weight1 = 169 lb
| style1 = Orthodox
| hometown1 = Youngstown, Ohio, U.S.
| recognition1 = WBC, WBO, and The Ring middleweight champion[[The Ring (magazine)|The Ring]] No. 7 ranked pound-for-pound fighter
| fighter2 = Bernard Hopkins
| nickname2 = The Executioner
| record2 = 48-5-1–1 (32 KO)
| height2 = 6 ft 1 in
| weight2 = 170 lb
| style2 = Orthodox
| hometown2 = Philadelphia, Pennsylvania, U.S.
| recognition2 =The Ring No. 4 ranked pound-for-pound fighter2-division world champion
| titles = 
|result = Hopkins wins via 12-round unanimous decision (119-106, 118-108, 117-109)
}}

Kelly Pavlik vs. Bernard Hopkins, billed as Unstoppable'', was a boxing match that took place on October 18, 2008, at the Boardwalk Hall in Atlantic City, New Jersey, between then-43-year-old Hopkins and 26-year-old Pavlik. 

The three judges scored the fight 119-106, 118-108, and 117-109 for Hopkins. The win by Hopkins ended Pavlik's previously unbeaten record, while Hopkins extended his legacy by dominating the then lineal middleweight champion.

Upset of the year
Ring Magazine named this fight upset of the year for 2008.

Sports Illustrated also named this fight upset of the year for 2008.

References

Pavlik
2008 in boxing
2008 in sports in New Jersey
October 2008 sports events in the United States
Boxing matches at Boardwalk Hall